The 23rd Annual Gardel Awards ceremony was held on July 23, 2021, and it was presented with no in-person ceremony due to the COVID-19 pandemic. The television broadcast of the show was in charge of the TNT Latin America, while LRA Radio Nacional provided radio coverage. The ceremony recognized the best recordings, compositions, and artists of the eligibility year, which ran from January 1, 2020 to January 31, 2020. The nominations were announced on May 7, 2021. The ceremony was hosted by television personalities Jey Mammón and Eleonora Pérez Caressi.

Nathy Peluso received the most nominations, with nine, followed by Fito Páez and Bizarrap with six each. The list of performers was unveiled on July 16, 2021, and consisted of forty-two artists including headliners Fito Páez, Cazzu, Ciro y los Persas, Soledad, Luciano Pereyra, María Becerra, David Lebón, Miranda! and Abel Pintos. Moreover, Spanish singer Pablo Alborán and Mexican singer Carlos Rivera were announced as special acts.

Nathy Peluso and Fito Páez won the most awards of the night, with four each. Peluso's wins included Record of the Year for her album Calambre and Best New Artist, while Páez's included Album of the Year (Gardel de Oro Award) and Best Rock Album for La Conquista del Espacio. The Song of the Year award went to Lali and Cazzu for their song "Ladrón".

Nominees
Nominees and winners were taken from the Gardel Awards website. Winners appear first and highlighted in Bold.

General field
Album of the Year
 La Conquista del Espacio – Fito Páez
 Ya No Mires Atrás – Luis Alberto Spinetta
 Calambre – Nathy Peluso

Song of the Year
 "Ladrón" – Lali & Cazzu
 "Piedra Libre" – Abel Pintos
 "Suficiente" – Babasónicos
 "Que No" – Barbi Recanati
 "Nathy Peluso: Bzrp Music Sessions, Vol. 36" – Bizarrap & Nathy Peluso
 "Amanece" – Diego Torres, Macaco & Villamizar featuring Catalina García
 "La Canción de las Bestias" – Fito Páez
 "Juntos para Siempre" – Los Auténticos Decadentes
 "Colocao" – Nicki Nicole
 "Ella Dice" – Tini & Khea

Record of the Year
 "Buenos Aires" – Nathy Peluso
 Rafa Arcaute, producer; Mariano López, Rafa Arcaute, Didi Gutman, Maddox Chhim & Felipe Tichauer, engineer
 "Como La Cigarra" – Elena Roger & Escalandrum
 Horacio Sarria, Mariano Uccello & Mercedes Otero, producers; Facundo Rodriguez, engineer
 "Me Enamoré de Ti" – Luciano Pereyra & Lang Lang
 Luciano Pereyra, producer; Dario Pacheco, engineer

Best New Artist
 Calambre – Nathy Peluso
 Atrevido – Trueno
 Mi Primer Día Triste – Zoe Gotusso

Collaboration of the Year
 "Bohemio" – Andrés Calamaro & Julio Iglesias
 "Como La Cigarra" – Elena Roger & Escalandrum
 "Gente en la Calle" – Fito Páez featuring Lali
 "Me Enamoré de Ti" – Luciano Pereyra & Lang Lang
 "Un Beso en Madrid" – Tini & Alejandro Sanz

Pop
Best Pop Album
 Mi Primer Día Triste – Zoe Gotusso
 Libra – Lali
 Tini Tini Tini – Tini

Best Pop Group Album
 Paranoia Pop – Bandalos Chinos
 Tándem – Mavi Díaz & Germán Dominicé
 El Reflejo – Rayos Láser

Rock
Best Rock Album
 La Conquista del Espacio – Fito Páez
 Guerras (Un Viaje en el Tiempo) – Ciro y los Persas
 Errores Coleccionables – Sol Bassa

Best Rock Group Album
 Es Así – Las Pelotas
 2020 – Las Pastillas del Abuelo
 El Último Abrazo Analógico – Todo Aparenta Normal

Best Hard Rock/Punk Album
 Carne, Tierras y Sangre – Pilsen
 Sr. Punk – Mal Momento
 Liberarse y Existir – Tano Romano

Urban/Reggae
Best Urban/Trap Song or Album
 "Nathy Peluso: Bzrp Music Sessions, Vol. 36" – Bizarrap & Nathy Peluso
 Una Niña Inútil – Cazzu<
 "High (Remix)" – María Becerra, Tini & Lola Indigo
 "Colocao" – Nicki Nicole
 "Mamichula – Trueno, Nicki Nicole & Bizarrap

Best Urban/Trap Collaboration
 "Mamichula – Trueno, Nicki Nicole & Bizarrap
 "Goteo (Remix)" – Duki, Ronny J & Pablo Chill-E featuring Capo Plaza & C.R.O
 "Verte" – Nicki Nicole, Dread Mar-I & Bizarrap

Best Raggae/Ska Album
 Flores y Burbujas – El Natty Combo
 El Presente que Soñamos Dub – Kameleba & Don Camel
 Continentes – La Estafa Dub

Tango
Best Tango Album
 La bella indiferencia – Mariana Mazú
 Génesis – Carolina Minella
 Tango – Cristian Palacios

Best Instrumental/Tango Group or Orchestra Album
 Tango Improvisado – José Colángelo & Franco Luciani
 Cruces Urbanos, Vol. 2 – Quinteto Negro La Boca
 Reinventango – Tanghetto

Folk
Best Folklore Album
 Abrazo – Luciana Jury
 Entre Risa – Bruno Arias
 Veinteveinte – Suna Rocha

Best Folklore Group Album
 Ahyre – Ahyre
 Desde Adentro – Los del Portezuelo
 Tierra Mía – Los Tekis

Best Chamamé Album
 Hielo Azul Tierra Roja – Chango Spasiuk & Per Einar Watle
 Mujer de Chamamé – Marcia Müller
 Con Ritmo y Alegría – Milagrito Gómez

Tropical/Cuarteto
Best Tropical Album
 Es Lo Que Hay – El Dipy
 El Último Romántico – Daniel Cardozo
 Otra Vez, Dando Clase – Román El Original

Best Tropical Group Album
 De Buenos Aires para el Mundo – Los Ángeles Azules
 Seguimos – Amar Azul
 Sesiones Musikeras – Mala Fama

Best Cuarteto Album
 Aprender a Volar – Magui Olave
 Música en Cuarentena – Luis Sebastián
 Un Sueño Hecho Realidad – Walter Salinas

Best Cuarteto Group Album
 El Mismo Aire – La K'onga
 Mundo Streaming – Q'Lokura
 Desde El Encierro – Sabroso

Alternative
Best Alternative Pop Album
 Calambre – Nathy Peluso
 Otro Lado – Rosario Ortega 
 Existo – Sol Pereyra

Best Alternative Rock Album
 Ubicación en Tiempo Real – Barbi Recanati
 Los Años Futuros – 1915
 Lapsus – Zero Kill

Best Alternative Folklore Album
 Renacer – Nahuel Pennisi
 Parte de Mí – Soledad
 Triángula – Triángula

Dance/Electronic
Best Electronic Music Album
 Reworked – Willy Crook
 Pleasures – Mo.NA
 Venus – Mistol Team

Romantic/Melodic
Best Romantic/Melodic Album
 60 Años con la Música ¡Gracias! – Dany Martin
 Tal Como Soy – Dany Vila
 Desierto – Germán Barceló

Classical
Best Classical Album
 Debussy Preludios para el Piano – Haydée Schvartz
 Villa-Lobos – Daniela Salinas
 Territorios: Paisaje Latinoamericano en el Piano – Fernanda Morello

Jazz
Best Jazz Album
 Malosetti & la Colonia – Javier Malosetti
 Sin Tiempo – Leo Genovese, Mariano Otero & Sergio Verdinelli
 Apaláp! – Oscar Giunta Supertrío!

Instrumental/Fusion/World Music
Best Instrumental/Fusion/World Music Album
 Solo Piano: Reflexiones – Lito Vitale
 Hikkikomori – La Chicana
 Latineses – La Orquestonga

Live
Best Live Album
 Foro Sol – Los Auténticos Decadentes
 Mujeres Argentinas, 50 Años (En Vivo en el CCK) – La Bruja Salguero & Facundo Ramírez
 En Vivo Teatro Gran Rex – Rodrigo Tapari

Singer-Songwriting
Best Singer-Songwriting Album
 Criptograma – Lisandro Aristimuño
 Reset – Celli
 Basta de Música – Martín Buscaglia

Children
Best Children's Album
 El Reino del Revés – Elena Roger & Escalandrum
 Topa, Una Navidad Especial – Diego Topa
 La Tarara: Canciones Tradicionales – Mariana Baggio & Martin Telechansk

Music for Visual Media
Best Cinema/Television/Audiovisual Production Soundtrack Album
 The Last of Us Part II – Gustavo Santaolalla
 Notas de Paso 4 – Ernesto Snajer
 Vilas: Serás lo que Debas Ser, o No Serás Nada – Vandera

Historical
Best Catalog Collection Album
 Agujero Interior – Virus
 Piazzolla – Buenos Aires 8
 Santaolalla (Remasterizado 2020) – Gustavo Santaolalla

Archival Concept
Best Conceptual Album
 Ya No Mires Atrás – Luis Alberto Spinetta
 Una Niña Inútil – Cazzu
 Oasis – Daniel Melingo
 Como La Cigarra – Elena Roger & Escalandrum

Production
Producer of the Year
 La Conquista del Espacio – Fito Páez
 Fito Páez, Diego Olivero & Gustavo Borner, producers
 Ahyre – Ahyre
 Juan José Vasconcellos & Sebastián Choque, producers
 Calambre – Nathy Peluso
 Rafa Arcaute, producer

Recording Engineering
Best Recording Engineering
 La Conquista del Espacio – Fito Páez
 Gustavo Borner, Phil Levine, Justin Moshkevich & Diego Olivero, recording engineers
 Caligaris Sinfónico – Los Caligaris
 Pablo Chapur, recording engineer
 "Como La Cigarra" – Elena Roger & Escalandrum
 Facundo Rodriguez, recording engineer

Cover Design
Best Cover Design
 Criptograma – Lisandro Aristimuño
 Valentín López López & Lisandro Aristimuño, graphic designers
 Una Niña Inútil – Cazzu
 Segundo Paladino, graphic designer
 Calambre – Nathy Peluso
 Albert Romagosa, graphic designer

Music Video/Film
Best Music Video
 "Todo Esto" – Kevin Johansen featuring David Lebón
 Bruno Adamovsky, director
 "Nathy Peluso: Bzrp Music Sessions, Vol. 36" – Bizarrap & Nathy Peluso
 Bizarrap, director
 "Ciudad Extraña" – Moris & Antonio Birabent
 Augusto González Polo, director

Best DVD
 Almendra I - 50 Años – Almendra
 Diego Latorre, director
 Niguiri Sessions – Dante Spinetta
 Niko Sedano, director
 Placer – Paula Maffía
 Emiliano Romero, director

Multiple nominations and awards
The following received multiple nominations:

Nine:
 Nathy Peluso
Six:
 Bizarrap
 Fito Páez
Five:
 Escalandrum
 Elena Roger
 Nicki Nicole

Four:
 Cazzu
 Tini
Three:
 Lali
 Trueno

Two:
 Ahyre
 Barbi Recanati
 Gustavo Santaolalla
 Lang Lang
 Lisandro Aristimuño
 Los Auténticos Decadentes
 Luciano Pereyra
 Luis Alberto Spinetta
 Zoe Gotusso

The following received multiple awards:
Four:
 Fito Páez
 Nathy Peluso
''Two:
 Bizarrap
 Lisandro Aristimuño

References

2021 in Latin music
2021 music awards
July 2021 events in Argentina
Song awards
Argentine music awards